The Prince of Arcadia (German: Der Prinz von Arkadien) is a 1932 Austrian-German romance film directed by Karl Hartl and starring Willi Forst, Liane Haid and Hedwig Bleibtreu. It was shot at the Sievering Studios of Sascha Film in Vienna with sets designed by the art director Hans Ledersteger. Location filming took place at Ragusa in Sicily. It premiered on 18 May 1932.

Cast
 Willi Forst as Der Prinz von Arkadien 
 Liane Haid as Mary Mirana, eine Schauspielerin 
 Hedwig Bleibtreu as Die Ex-Fürstin Tante 
 Albert Paulig as Flügeladjutant Mölke zu Mölke 
 Ingeborg Grahn as Die Infantin 
 Edwin Jürgensen   
 Reinhold Häussermann   
 Alfred Neugebauer   
 Ernst Arndt
 Walter Brandt   
 Herbert Hübner   
 Gustav Müller  
 Paul Pranger

References

Bibliography
 Grange, William. Cultural Chronicle of the Weimar Republic. Scarecrow Press, 2008.

External links

1932 films
1932 romantic comedy films
1932 musical comedy films
Austrian romantic comedy films
German romantic comedy films
Austrian musical comedy films
German musical comedy films
Films of the Weimar Republic
1930s German-language films
Films directed by Karl Hartl
Films set in Europe
German black-and-white films
1930s romantic musical films
Films scored by Robert Stolz
1930s German films
Films shot at Sievering Studios
Films shot in Sicily